Pinehurst is a city in Orange County, Texas, United States. The population was 2,232 at the 2020 census. It is part of the Beaumont–Port Arthur Metropolitan Statistical Area.

Geography

Pinehurst is located at  (30.108371, –93.773892).

According to the United States Census Bureau, the city has a total area of 1.8 square miles (4.6 km), all of it land.

Demographics

As of the 2020 United States census, there were 2,232 people, 914 households, and 617 families residing in the city.

As of the census of 2000, there were 2,274 people, 962 households, and 605 families residing in the city. The population density was 1,280.8 people per square mile (493.3/km). There were 1,059 housing units at an average density of 596.5/sq mi (229.7/km). The racial makeup of the city was 85.97% White, 8.75% African American, 0.66% Native American, 0.66% Asian, 1.93% from other races, and 2.02% from two or more races. Hispanic or Latino of any race were 4.79% of the population.

There were 962 households, out of which 22.1% had children under the age of 18 living with them, 49.8% were married couples living together, 10.0% had a female householder with no husband present, and 37.1% were non-families. 33.9% of all households were made up of individuals, and 19.0% had someone living alone who was 65 years of age or older. The average household size was 2.26 and the average family size was 2.84.

In the city, the population was spread out, with 20.4% under the age of 18, 7.7% from 18 to 24, 22.2% from 25 to 44, 25.6% from 45 to 64, and 24.1% who were 65 years of age or older. The median age was 45 years. For every 100 females, there were 85.3 males. For every 100 females age 18 and over, there were 81.6 males.

The median income for a household in the city was $32,827, and the median income for a family was $41,563. Males had a median income of $34,196 versus $24,018 for females. The per capita income for the city was $19,482. About 15.6% of families and 17.2% of the population were below the poverty line, including 27.7% of those under age 18 and 14.3% of those age 65 or over.

Education
The City of Pinehurst is served by the West Orange-Cove Consolidated Independent School District.

References

External links
 City of Pinehurst – Official site
 Destiny Church – Official site

Cities in Orange County, Texas
Cities in Texas
Cities in the Beaumont–Port Arthur metropolitan area